Prasanna Ranatunga (born 1 January 1967) is a Sri Lankan politician, member of parliament, and current Minister of Urban Development and Housing. He was also appointed as the Chief Government Whip on 18 April 2022. He was the 7th Chief Minister of Western Province, Sri Lanka.

He belongs to the Sri Lanka Podujana Peramuna and part of the Sri Lanka People's Freedom Alliance. He is the brother of former Sri Lanka cricket captain Arjuna Ranatunga. Ranatunga entered parliament in 2015 from Gampaha District as an opposition member. Ranatunga received a vote count of 384,448 in the 2015 parliamentary elections

On 6 June 2022, he was sentenced to two years of rigorous imprisonment suspended for five years, after he was found guilty of threatening a businessman from whom he solicited a bribe of Rs. 64 million to evict unauthorised occupants of a parcel of land.

See also
List of political families in Sri Lanka

References

Sri Lankan Buddhists
Chief Ministers of Western Province, Sri Lanka
Members of the 15th Parliament of Sri Lanka
Members of the 16th Parliament of Sri Lanka
Sri Lanka Podujana Peramuna politicians
Provincial councillors of Sri Lanka
Living people
Sri Lanka Freedom Party politicians
United People's Freedom Alliance politicians
Sinhalese politicians
1967 births